Micah Keith Stampley (born September 7, 1971) is an American gospel singer-songwriter and actor.

Early life 

Micah Stampley was born on September 7, 1971 to Richard and Delmarie Stampley. The fifth of eight children, he exhibited his musical talent from the tender age of four. By age seven, he was directing the church choir and teaching vocal arrangements and harmonies. Micah grew up in Baton Rouge, Louisiana.

Stampley spent his youth soaking up the sounds of Andrae Crouch, Michael W. Smith and Shirley Caesar as well as Michael Jackson, Billy Ocean and Cyndi Lauper.

Stampley graduated from Natchitoches Central High School where he earned several music awards.  By age 13 he was serving as the minister of music together with his brother (who was his best friend) in their father's church.

Career 
Stampley sang, between 1994 and 1997, in Rev. Earl Johnson's church in Pasadena, California. Then he went back to Louisiana, at his father's church music department. In 1998 he married Heidi Jones, a fellow gospel singer and nursing student. Heidi has been instrumental in her husband's career, writing several songs for his debut album. In 1999 the couple relocated to New Orleans when Stampley accepted a position as co-choir director and musician for Bishop Paul Morton's Greater St. Stephen's Church.

In 2003 Stampley became assistant minister of music at St. Agnes Baptist Church in Houston. Organist Marcus Dawson, an associate of Bishop T. D. Jakes, noticed Stampley's voice. The following January Stampley won the 2004 Stellar Award Gospel Star Search competition. Stampley signed a record contract with Jakes and Dawson, refusing some other labels.

In March 2005, he became the second male gospel artist to have a high debut on the Billboard's chat when his first album, The Songbook of Micah, debuted at number three of Billboard's chart

In 2014 he shared the same stage with Donnie McClurkin and other prominent gospel ministers at the Experience, an annual event held in Nigeria. Over 600,000 people attended.

On May 20, 2016, he released his next album: "To the King: Vertical Worship". This album featured hit songs from previous albums as well as fresh sounds like the hit single "Be Lifted" which was named as one of the top hot new songs in 2016 by BlackGospel.com. The album debuted at number 2 on Billboard's Top Gospel Album Chart

Artistry

Voice

Micah Stampley has a multi-octave vocal range spanning from bass-to-first soprano and is well known for that. His voice has literally staggering power and sensitivity. He has never had any formal vocal training. He says about his own voice: “It’s just a sound that God has given me, I think He just kind of fine tuned my vocal chords and gave me this high register. I can sing bass and/or soprano naturally. It’s pretty amazing and to be honest, I can’t explain it.  It’s just something that happens whenever I feel the presence of God come over me.  I sing at heights that I never thought any man would sing.” 

His voice has often been compared with Grammy award winner Donnie McClurkin who is also known in the gospel community for his high notes. Both stars disagree to this but Donnie has expressed his profound admiration of Micah Stampley's outstanding vocal dexterity.
Micah has the stamina to hold notes for lengths of time without wavering in pitch or tone, seemingly effortlessly.

In 2005, Billboard magazine placed him on its Top 10 Gospel Music Artists list and AOL Black Voices included him on its roster of Top 11 Gospel Geniuses.

Awards and nominations

Personal life

Micah and Heidi Stampley are the co-founders of Interface Entertainment and Operation I Believe, Inc., a 501(c)(3) non-profit organization, launched in 2006 with platforms that include humanitarian and outreach initiatives. Micah is a third-generation licensed preacher.

Discography
 To the King: Vertical Worship (2016)
 Love Never Fails (2013)
 One Voice (2011)
 Release Me (2010)
 Ransomed (2008)
 A Fresh Wind ... the Second Sound (2006)
 The Songbook of Micah (2005)

Filmography
 Anchorman Part II
 Appearing on TV in Tyler Perry's House of Pain
 Necessary Roughness

References

1971 births
Living people
Male actors from Los Angeles
Singers from Los Angeles
African-American male actors
20th-century African-American male singers
21st-century American male actors
21st-century African-American people